Rip It Off is the third album by Columbus, Ohio-based trio Times New Viking. It is their first release for Matador Records, as their two previous albums were released on Siltbreeze Records.

Track listing
 "Teen Drama"
 "(My Head)"
 "RIP Allegory"
 "Wait"
 "Drop-Out"
 "Come Together"
 "Faces On Fire"
 "Relevant: Now"
 "Early 80s"
 "Mean God"
 "Another Day"
 "The Apt."
 "Off the Wall"
 "End Of All Things"
 "Times New Viking vs. Yo La Tengo"
 "Post Teen Drama"

References

2008 albums
Times New Viking albums
Matador Records albums